Chromosome 19 is one of the 23 pairs of chromosomes in humans. People normally have two copies of this chromosome. Chromosome 19 spans more than 61.7 million base pairs, the building material of DNA. It is considered the most gene-rich chromosome containing roughly 1,500 genes, despite accounting for only 2 percent of the human genome.

Genes

Number of genes 
The following are some of the gene count estimates of human chromosome 19. Because researchers use different approaches to genome annotation, their predictions of the number of genes on each chromosome varies (for technical details, see gene prediction). Among various projects, the collaborative consensus coding sequence project (CCDS) takes an extremely conservative strategy. So CCDS's gene number prediction represents a lower bound on the total number of human protein-coding genes.

Gene list 

The following is a partial list of genes on human chromosome 19. For complete list, see the link in the infobox on the right.

Short arm

Long arm

Diseases and disorders
The following diseases are some of those related to genes on chromosome 19:

 Alternating hemiplegia of childhood
 Alzheimer's disease
 CADASIL
 Centronuclear myopathy autosomal dominant form
 Charcot–Marie–Tooth disease
 Congenital hearing loss
 Congenital hypothyroidism
 Donohue syndrome
 Familial hemiplegic migraine
 Glutaric acidemia type 1
 Hemochromatosis
 HUPRA syndrome
 Leber congenital amaurosis
 Maple syrup urine disease
 Marfan syndrome
 Multiple epiphyseal dysplasia
 Myotonic dystrophy
 Myotubular myopathy autosomal dominant form
 Oligodendroglioma
 Peutz–Jeghers syndrome
 Prolidase deficiency
 Pseudoachondroplasia
 Spinocerebellar ataxia type 6
 X-linked agammaglobulinemia or Bruton's disease

Cytogenetic band

References

 
 Human Proteome Project Launch website~ https://web.archive.org/web/20110726163128/http://www.hupo.org/research/hpp/HPP_legrain_sep_2010.pdf

External links

 
 

Chromosomes (human)